Caroline Diane Krass (born January 5, 1968) is an American attorney and government official who currently serves as the General Counsel of the Department of Defense. 

Krass was a partner at the Washington office of the Los Angeles-based law firm Gibson Dunn (formerly Gibson, Dunn & Crutcher). She served as General Counsel for the Central Intelligence Agency from 2014 to 2017, and prior to that as Principal Deputy Assistant Attorney General for the Office of Legal Counsel, and briefly as the Acting Assistant Attorney General at the United States Department of Justice. She has also been a lawyer in the State Department, the Treasury Department, United States National Security Council, and the Office of the United States Attorney for the District of Columbia.

Early life and education
Krass was born in Santa Barbara, California. She received her B.A. from Stanford University in 1989, where she was elected to Phi Beta Kappa. She went on to study at Yale Law School, serving as an editor of the Yale Law Journal and receiving her J.D. in 1993.

Career
Krass clerked for Judge Patricia Wald on the United States Court of Appeals for the District of Columbia Circuit from 1993 to 1994. She then served as an attorney-advisor at the Office of the Legal Adviser of the Department of State from 1994 to 1996. She subsequently served various roles as a lawyer in the Department of the Treasury, the National Security Council, and the Office of Legal Counsel of the Department of Justice. She also served as a Special Assistant United States Attorney for the District of Columbia from 2007 to 2009, as well as a Special Advisor to the President of the United States on National Security Issues before becoming the Principal Deputy Assistant Attorney General for the Office of Legal Counsel.

President Barack Obama nominated Krass to replace Robert Eatinger as the General Counsel for the Central Intelligence Agency. On March 13, 2014, after a heated confirmation debate, the Senate confirmed Krass in a 95-4 vote for the position.

On May 8, 2017, Gibson Dunn announced that Krass had joined the firm's Washington, D.C. office as a partner.

Krass joined insurance company AIG in 2018, serving as its Senior Vice President and General Counsel, General Insurance, and Deputy General Counsel, AIG.

Nomination to Defense Department
President Joe Biden nominated Krass to the position of General Counsel of the Department of Defense on April 28, 2021. The Senate's Armed Forces Committee held hearings on her nomination on June 16, 2021. Krass' nomination was favorably reported by the committee on June 22, 2021. The Senate confirmed the nomination by a voice vote on July 22, 2021. She was sworn in on August 2, 2021.

References

External links

|-

1968 births
Living people
People from Santa Barbara, California
20th-century American lawyers
21st-century American lawyers
Stanford University alumni
Obama administration personnel
George W. Bush administration personnel
Clinton administration personnel
Biden administration personnel
United States Department of Defense officials
Yale Law School alumni
United States Assistant Attorneys General for the Office of Legal Counsel
20th-century American women lawyers
21st-century American women lawyers
People associated with Gibson Dunn